The H type ordinary chondrites are the most common type of meteorite, accounting for approximately 40% of all those catalogued, 46% of the ordinary chondrites, and 44% of all chondrites. The ordinary chondrites are thought to have originated from three parent asteroids, whose fragments make up the H chondrite, L chondrite and LL chondrite groups respectively.

Name 
The name comes from their High iron abundance, with respect to other ordinary chondrites.

Historically, the H chondrites have been named bronzite chondrites or olivine bronzite chondrites for the dominant minerals, but these terms are now obsolete.

Parent body 
A probable parent body for this group is the S-type asteroid 6 Hebe, with less likely candidates being 3 Juno and 7 Iris. It is supposed that these meteorites arise from impacts onto small near-Earth asteroids broken off from  6 Hebe in the past, rather than originating from 6 Hebe directly.

The H chondrites have very similar trace element abundances and Oxygen isotope ratios to the IIE iron meteorites, making it likely that they both originate from the same parent body.

Iron
Their high iron abundance is about 25–31% by weight. Over half of this is present in metallic form, making these meteorites strongly magnetic despite the stony chondritic appearance.

Mineralogy
The most abundant minerals are bronzite (an orthopyroxene), and olivine. Characteristic is the fayalite (Fa) content of the olivine of 16 to 20 mol%. They contain also 15–19% of nickel-iron metal and about 5% of troilite. The majority of these meteorites have been significantly metamorphosed, with over 40% being in petrologic class 5, most of the rest in classes 4 and 6. Only a few (about 2.5%) are of the largely unaltered petrologic class 3.

Gallery

See also
 Glossary of meteoritics

References

External links
The Catalogue of Meteorites 

fi:H-kondriitti